"This Ole House" (sometimes written "This Old House") is an American popular song written by Stuart Hamblen, and published in 1954. Rosemary Clooney's version reached the top of the popular music charts in both the US and the UK in 1954. The song again topped the UK chart in 1981 in a recording by Shakin' Stevens.

Stuart Hamblen version 
Hamblen recorded the song in March 1954 and released it as a single in May 1954. It became very successful, peaking at number 2 on the Billboard Country & Western chart, as well as being a Top 30 hit on the Hot 100, known then as the Best Sellers in Stores. It was his last hit on the country charts and with the royalties he bought the mansion that had been owned by the late Errol Flynn.

Composition
Hamblen was supposedly out on a hunting expedition in the Sierra with guide Monte Wolfe, when he and his fellow hunter, actor John Wayne, came across a hut in the mountains. Inside was the body of a man, and the man's dog was still there, guarding the building.  This inspired Hamblen to write "This Ole House".

The song describes the last words of an old man living in an old house that has fallen into such disrepair that it is no longer structurally sound. The man tells of how the house "once knew his children" and "once knew his wife," but that he was not going to need it any longer nor did he have time to repair the house's numerous flaws because he is dying and going to heaven very soon ("ready to meet the saints").

Reception 
The single was reviewed twice in Billboard magazine. It was described as "a powerful religioso item with a message and an infectious beat. Hamblen sells it with fervor." and that it "could easily break thru into country and pop". In the following issue, it was described as "a sacred item which re-esablishes Hamblen as the top man in his field" and "a sock debut for Hamblen on the label."

Charts

Weekly charts

Year-end charts

Rosemary Clooney version 

Soon after Hamblen released his version, Rosemary Clooney recorded a version of "This Ole House" with Buddy Cole & His Orchestra. It featured bass vocals by Thurl Ravenscroft and topped the charts in the US and the UK.

In the US, it was released as the flip side to "Hey There", which also reached number 1. However, in the UK, it was released as the A-side, with the flip side "My Baby Sends Me".

When reviewed in Billboard, it was described as "a bright, bouncy rendition from the thrush, supported solidly by an unbilled male singer and the Buddy Cole ork. Tho not as strong as the flip. it has a sparkle that could make It grab juke loot."

Track listings 
7" (US)

 "Hey There" – 2:57
 "This Ole House" – 2:18

7" (UK)

 "This Ole House"
 "My Baby Sends Me"

Charts

Weekly charts

Year-end charts

Shakin' Stevens version 

In 1981, Welsh singer Shakin' Stevens covered NRBQ's arrangement  of the song for his album of the same name. It became very successful, topping the UK Singles Chart for three weeks, as well as being a hit in several other countries. It was re-released in 2005 as a double A-side with a cover of Pink's "Trouble" after his appearance in the TV show Hit Me Baby One More Time and reached No. 20 in the UK Singles Chart.

Charts

Weekly charts

Year-end charts

Certifications and sales

Other notable recordings
1954: Billie Anthony's version was a hit in the UK, peaking at number 4 in October
1954: Bing Crosby recorded the song in 1954 for use on his radio show and it was subsequently included in the CD Bing & Rosie: The Crosby-Clooney Radio Sessions (2010).
1998: The Brian Setzer Orchestra on The Dirty Boogie
2010: Ernie Haase & Signature Sound on their DVD/CD A Tribute to The Cathedral Quartet

References

External links
 Lyrics to "This Ole House"

1954 singles
1981 singles
UK Singles Chart number-one singles
Number-one singles in Australia
Songs written by Stuart Hamblen
Shakin' Stevens songs
Rosemary Clooney songs
Stoney Cooper songs
Wilma Lee Cooper songs
Stuart Hamblen songs
1954 songs
Songs about old age
Songs about death